A Day in Black and White is a 1999 American comedy film written and directed by Desmond Hall.

Synopsis
A young black writer (Harold Perrineau), asked to write and present a speech on race relations, reaches out to a white friend (Anthony DeSando) for his input. As the two discuss the speech and the racial issues being addressed within it, their differences in views transform a friendly conversation into a heated debate. The pair continue their argument on and off throughout the day, as they discuss a variety of racially-charged topics, from the OJ Simpson trial to disco and interracial dating, with each other and a number of other characters.

Cast
 Harold Perrineau as Black Man
 Anthony DeSando as White Man
 Stephanie Berry
 Francie Swift
 Lonette McKee
 Ron Cephas Jones
 Joseph Siravo

Release
A Day in Black and White premiered at the SXSW FIlm Festival on March 14, 1999. The film was purchased by HBO and scheduled for a February 2001 broadcast premiere.

Reception
A Day in Black and White received generally mixed to positive reviews. Jerry Renshaw of The Austin Chronicle wrote in his review that the film "manages to find fresh approaches to a very serious subject", calling it "a rare film that can take such an overheated subject and treat it in a witty, entertaining way, thought-provoking without being inflammatory". Godfrey Cheshire of Variety wrote A Day in Black and White was "(s)incere, insightful and sometimes flat-out hilarious", but stated "the pic suffers only from being a string of clever, topical dialogues rather than a fully fleshed narrative". Elvis Mitchell wrote in The Atlanta Journal-Constitution that the film "erred a bit on the side of didacticism, not trusting the acuity of the humor to get its points across"", but still referred to the film as "good stuff".

The film was a finalist for the Gordon Parks Award for Desmond Hall's direction in 1999.

References

External links
 
 
 

1999 films
1999 comedy films
American comedy films
Films about racism
1990s English-language films
1990s American films